Divide County is a county in the U.S. state of North Dakota. As of the 2020 census, the population was 2,195. Its county seat is Crosby.

History
On November 8, 1910, election, the voters of Williams County voters determined that the county should be divided into a northern and a southern county. The vote was affirmative; the southern portion retained the Williams name; the newly created county was named "Divide", with Crosby as the seat. The county government was effected on December 9 of that year, and the county's boundaries have remained unchanged since that time. Most histories attribute the county name to its "division" from Williams County, though the county's location on the Laurentian Divide, separating runoff waters between Hudson Bay and Gulf of Mexico, may have been involved.

Geography
Divide County lies at the northwest corner of North Dakota. Its northern boundary line abuts the south boundary line of Canada, opposite Saskatchewan, and its west boundary line abuts the east boundary line of the state of Montana. The terrain of Divide County consists of semi-arid rolling hills, dotted with lakes and ponds, partially devoted to agriculture. The terrain generally slopes to the east; the northern part also slopes to the north while the southern part slopes to the south.

Divide County is one of several western North Dakota counties with significant exposure to the Bakken Formation in the Williston Basin.

Major highways

  U.S. Highway 85
  North Dakota Highway 5
  North Dakota Highway 40
  North Dakota Highway 42

Adjacent counties and rural municipalities

 Rural Municipality (RM) of Lake Alma No. 8, Saskatchewan (SK) - northwest
 RM of Souris Valley No. 7, SK - north
 RM of Cambria No. 6, SK - north
 RM of Estevan No. 5, SK - northeast
 Burke County - east
 Williams County - south
 Sheridan County, Montana - west

Lakes

 Bright Water Lake
 McCone Lake
 Miller Lake
 Musta Lake
 North Lake
 Rattler Lake
 Round Lake (part)
 Willow Lake

Demographics

2000 census
As of the 2000 census, there were 2,283 people, 1,005 households, and 649 families in the county. The population density was 1.8 people per square mile (0.7/km2). There were 1,469 housing units at an average density of 1.2 per square mile (0.4/km2). The racial makeup of the county was 98.99% White, 0.13% Native American, 0.53% Asian, 0.18% from other races, and 0.18% from two or more races. 0.61% of the population were Hispanic or Latino of any race.

There were 1,005 households, out of which 22.5% had children under the age of 18 living with them, 56.8% were married couples living together, 4.2% had a female householder with no husband present, and 35.4% were non-families. 33.4% of all households were made up of individuals, and 19.9% had someone living alone who was 65 years of age or older. The average household size was 2.18 and the average family size was 2.79.

The county population contained 20.2% under the age of 18, 3.6% from 18 to 24, 20.1% from 25 to 44, 26.6% from 45 to 64, and 29.5% who were 65 years of age or older. The median age was 49 years. For every 100 females there were 100.8 males. For every 100 females age 18 and over, there were 97.5 males.

The median income for a household in the county was $30,089, and the median income for a family was $39,292. Males had a median income of $28,333 versus $16,371 for females. The per capita income for the county was $16,225.  About 9.5% of families and 14.6% of the population were below the poverty line, including 19.5% of those under age 18 and 14.7% of those age 65 or over.

The largest ancestries are Norwegian (64.7%), German (24.0%), Swedish (8.8%), and Irish (5.9%).

Among the population claiming adherence to a particular religious organization, 80.6% claimed adherence to the Evangelical Lutheran Church in America (ELCA) in 2010. This rate is the highest such rate for the ELCA among all counties in the United States.

2010 census
As of the 2010 census, there were 2,071 people, 977 households, and 584 families in the county. The racial makeup of the county was 98.0% white, 0.5% American Indian, 0.3% Asian, 0.2% black or African American, 0.0% from other races, and 0.8% from two or more races. Those of Hispanic or Latino origin made up 1.4% of the population. In terms of ancestry, 57.7% were Norwegian, 30.3% were German, 8.5% were Irish, 5.2% were Swedish, and 2.9% were American.

Of the 977 households, 19.8% had children under the age of 18 living with them, 51.2% were married couples living together, 4.5% had a female householder with no husband present, 40.2% were non-families, and 36.6% of all households were made up of individuals. The average household size was 2.05 and the average family size was 2.66. The median age was 51.4 years.

The median income for a household in the county was $48,152 and the median income for a family was $65,000. Males had a median income of $42,341 versus $27,596 for females. The per capita income for the county was $28,462. About 9.4% of families and 14.0% of the population were below the poverty line, including 40.7% of those under age 18 and 5.7% of those age 65 or over.

Population by decade

Places of interest
Two petroglyphs are displayed at Writing Rock State Historical Site in Writing Rock Township.

Communities

Cities

 Ambrose
 Crosby (county seat)
 Fortuna
 Noonan

Unincorporated communities

 Alkabo
 Colgan
 Juno
 Kermit
 Paulson
 Stady

Townships

 Alexandria
 Ambrose
 Blooming Prairie
 Blooming Valley
 Border
 Burg
 Clinton
 Coalfield
 Daneville
 De Witt
 Elkhorn
 Fertile Valley
 Fillmore
 Frazier
 Frederick
 Garnet
 Gooseneck
 Hawkeye
 Hayland
 Lincoln Valley
 Long Creek
 Mentor
 Palmer
 Plumer
 Sioux Trail
 Smoky Butte
 Stoneview
 Troy
 Twin Butte
 Upland
 Westby
 Writing Rock

Politics
Divide County has been a swing county, with a Republican tendency. Since 1960 the county has selected the Republican Party candidate in two-thirds of the national elections (as of 2020). It has selected the Republican party candidate in every presidential election since 2000.

See also
 National Register of Historic Places listings in Divide County, North Dakota
 Westby, Montana was founded in North Dakota in Divide County and then was moved to Montana.

References

External links
 Stories and histories of Divide County (1964) from the Digital Horizons website
 Divide County map, North Dakota DOT

 
1910 establishments in North Dakota
Populated places established in 1910